Ralph Dewsbury (1882–1921) was a British film director of the silent era.

Selected filmography
 The King's Outcast (1915)
 The Man in the Attic (1915)
 Partners at Last (1916)
 His Daughter's Dilemma (1916)
 Everybody's Business (1917)
 The Golden Dawn (1921)

References

Bibliography
 Low, Rachael. The History of British Film (Volume 3): The History of the British Film 1914 - 1918. Routledge, 2013.

External links

1882 births
1921 deaths
British film directors
People from Walsall